Yard Kings is a 2020 British short film written and directed by Vasco Alexandre  and produced by Billy King. It stars Elle Atkinson, David Price, Jermaine Ricketts and Caroline Lazarus.

The film is inspired by the British social realism tradition, which depicts people's struggle when living in poverty and exposed to various forms of violence.

Synopsis 
Ellie, a 9-year-old girl from a violent home, tries to escape her harsh reality by taking refuge in a scrapyard nearby with her friend Pete. Her way of spending her time is to build a "house" where she can dream of another existence.

Cast 
David Price  as Pete
Elle Atkinson as Ellie
Jermaine Ricketts as Alfie
Caroline Lazarus as Lisa

Accolades 
Yard Kings has received international nominations and awards, including 1 Giornate Della Luce Award at the Ca' Foscari Short Film Festival, 2 Royal Television Society Awards - the oldest television society in the world with Charles, Prince of Wales as patron; and 8 FFTG awards.

References

External links 
 

2020 independent films
2020 short films
2020s English-language films
British independent films
British short films
Films set in England